Neuburg Peak is a jagged rock peak in Antarctica, 1,840 m, rising 2.5 nautical miles (4.6 km) east of Walker Peak in the southwest part of Dufek Massif, Pensacola Mountains. It was mapped by the United States Geological Survey (USGS) from surveys and U.S. Navy air photos from 1956 to 1966. It was named by the Advisory Committee on Antarctic Names (US-ACAN) for Hugo A.C. Neuburg, a glaciologist at Ellsworth Station and a member of the first party to visit Dufek Massif in December 1957.

Mountains of Queen Elizabeth Land
Pensacola Mountains